The following people are recognized as notable homeopaths, either historically or currently:

 J. Ellis Barker (1870–1948) 
 Mukesh Batra (born 1951)
 C. L. Blood (born ca. 1834), patent medicine businessman
 Clemens Maria Franz von Bönninghausen (1785–1864)
 Samuel Cockburn (1823–1915), homeopathic surgeon and author based in Glasgow, Scotland
 Hawley Harvey Crippen (1862–1910)
 Peter Fisher (1950–2018)
 John Franklin Gray (1804–1882), the first practitioner of Homeopathy in the United States
 Melanie Hahnemann (1800–1878), wife of Samuel Hahnemann
 Samuel Hahnemann (1755–1843), founder of homeopathy
 Charles Julius Hempel, father of English homeopathic literature
 Constantine Hering (1800–1880), first president of the American Institute of Homeopathy
 Elizabeth Wright Hubbard (1896–1967)
 George Heinrich Gottlieb Jahr (1800–1875), pioneer of classical homeopathy
 James Tyler Kent (1849–1916) 
 E. B. Nash (1838–1917)
 Frederic Hervey Foster Quin (1799–1878), the first homeopathic physician in England
 Guy Beckley Stearns (1870–1947), American homeopath and author
 George Vithoulkas (born 1932)

References

Lists of health professionals